Muniyana Madari is a 1981 Indian Kannada-language film, directed and produced by S. K. Bhagavan. The film stars Shankar Nag, Jai Jagadish, Kokila Mohan and Jayamala. The film has musical score by Rajan–Nagendra.

Cast

 Shankar Nag
 Jai Jagadish
 Mohan
 Jayamala
 Rajya Lakshmi
 Leelavathi
 Rajanand
 Ramesh
 Lohithaswa
 Mysore Lokesh
 Anantharam Maccheri
 Kalale Dorai
 Bhatti Mahadevappa
 Chandrahas
 Kumar Aradhya
 Pranavamurthy
 Lalithamma
 Kaminidharan
 Prema
 Vijayaleela
 Rathnamma
 Shanthamma
 Master Ravi
 Master Srinidhi
 Master Prabhu

Soundtrack
The music was composed by Rajan–Nagendra.

References

External links
 
 

1980s Kannada-language films
Films scored by Rajan–Nagendra
Films directed by S. K. Bhagavan